Frederick Houghton ( – 15 November 1918) was an English semi-professional footballer who played as a left back and left half in the Football League for Stockport County.

Personal life 
Houghton worked for the Portwood Spinning Company in Stockport. He enlisted in the British Army in 1915 and served in the Cheshire Regiment during the First World War, rising to the appointed rank of lance corporal. He fought during the Mesopotamian Campaign and died of fever on 15 November 1918, just four days after the Armistice. He was buried in the Basra War Cemetery.

Career statistics

References

1890s births
1918 deaths
Date of birth missing
Footballers from Stockport
English footballers
Association football fullbacks
English Football League players
British Army personnel of World War I
Cheshire Regiment soldiers
Association football wing halves
Stockport County F.C. players
British military personnel killed in World War I
Burials at Basra War Cemetery
Military personnel from Cheshire